Traditional Chinese roofing refers to the numerous types of roofing, and roofing elements, employed in historic Chinese architecture. Traditional Chinese architecture employed a number of different roofing styles, which utilized different shapes, slopes, and ridges. The types of roofs would vary by historical era, with certain types of roofs gaining particular prominent through the reigns of certain dynasties. Other factors which shaped roofs in traditional Chinese architecture included precipitation and cultural connotations.

Varieties 

Traditional Chinese architecture employed numerous different roofing styles, most of which were sloped, although some flat roofs were employed. Flat roofs were particularly common in regions of Chinese with less precipitation, such as northern China. Among sloped roofs, traditional Chinese architecture employs single slope roofs, two slope roofs, and four slope roofs. Among four slope roofs, there are two styles: the five-ridged hip roof (also called the Chinese Hipped Roof or the fudian roof) and the nine-ridged xieshan roof.

Traditional Chinese architecture also includes many types of tented roofs, including three-corner tents, four-corner tents, six-corner tents, eight-corner tents, and rounded tents.

Ridgeless roofs, such as cuanjian roofs, have also been employed in traditional Chinese roofing, most notably, perhaps, in the Hall of Prayer for Good Harvests at the Temple of Heaven.

Lu roofs have a flat top, with four diagonal ridges surrounding the top. These roofs were particularly common throughout the Yuan dynasty.

Some traditional Chinese buildings have swastika-shaped roofs, due to the shape's historic connotations of luck and auspiciousness.

Roofs joined by multiple pieces, known as joined roofs were often constructed in traditional Chinese architecture to enable a large floor area without much height.

Many buildings at the Chengde Mountain Resort, a Qing dynasty complex of imperial palaces, employ juanpeng roofs.

Checkerboard roofs, named due to their checkered patterns, have also been employed in residential architecture.

Elements 

Traditional Chinese roofs are also distinguished by a number of distinct roofing elements, such as ridges.

In the county-level city of Jinjiang, in Fujian province, many older houses have downspouts (known locally as chuizhu) coming down from the edges of their roofs.

See also 

 Chinese architecture
 List of roof shapes

References 

Architecture in China
Roofs